Hard Times was a Canadian documentary television series which aired on CBC Television in 1975.

Premise
Ed Reid hosted this series of documentaries concerned Canadian life in the 1930s, particularly the history of the Great Depression. Newsreels and historic photographs were combined with interviews of people recounting their Depression-era experiences.

Hard Times was a prime-time repackaging of segments which previously aired in 1974 and 1975 on the daytime Take 30 series. Reid was a Take 30 co-host at that time.

Scheduling
This series aired on Mondays at 10:30 p.m. from 4 August to 2 September 1975.

References

External links
 

CBC Television original programming
1975 Canadian television series debuts
1975 Canadian television series endings